Municipal elections were held in Milan on 15–16 and 29–30 May 2011 to elect the Mayor and the 48 members of the City Council, as well as the nine presidents and 359 councillors of the nine administrative zones in which the municipality is divided.

The incumbent Mayor of Milan Letizia Moratti was defeated by the left-wing lawyer Giuliano Pisapia, ending 18 years of right-wing rule in the city government.

As a result of the election, Pisapia was elected on the second round becoming the first leftist mayor of Milan after nearly 20 years. The centre-left coalition gained control of 29 seats in the City Council.

Background

Centre-left primary election
In June 2010, Pisapia was the first to submit his own nomination as the Mayor of Milan, for the elections that would take place the following year. A number of intellectuals and notable people from the cultural and political elite of Milan immediately expressed their support to Pisapia.

On 14 November 2010 he ran for the open primary election of the centre-left coalition led by the Democratic Party, with the support of Nichi Vendola's Left Ecology Freedom, and unexpectedly won (receiving 45% preferences) despite not being an actual member of the PD:

Total voters: 67,499

Campaign
At the beginning of the campaign, incumbent Mayor Letizia Moratti was thought to be largely advantaged, especially as Milan is traditionally a right-wing stronghold, the homeland of Silvio Berlusconi's party (to which Moratti belongs), as well as a symbol of the alliance between Berlusconi and Umberto Bossi's Lega Nord, a party that promotes a greater independence of Northern Italy. Both Bossi and Berlusconi repeatedly declared that the left wing had no chance to win the elections in Milan, and Berlusconi himself actively contributed in the campaign, possibly to reaffirm his appeal to the Italian people leveraging on the results of what was supposed to be an easy match. Berlusconi warned that if Moratti was defeated, Milan would become a "Gypsytown" and an "Islamic city".

As Berlusconi had recently been involved in a number of controversial matters, including the so-called Ruby Gate, many observers described the elections in Milan as a poll that would assess the popular support of Berlusconi's politics. This attracted much attention to this particular election (one of many administrative elections held in the same days in several locations in Italy).

Voting system
The semipresidential voting system is used for all mayoral elections in Italy of cities with a population higher than 15,000 for the fifth time. Under this system voters express a direct choice for the mayor or an indirect choice voting for the party of the candidate's coalition. If no candidate receives at least 50% of votes, the top two candidates go to a second round after two weeks. This gives a result whereby the winning candidate may be able to claim majority support.

For zones the voting system is the same, not referred to the mayor but to the president of the zone.

The election of the City Council is based on a direct choice for the candidate with a preference vote: the candidate with the majority of the preferences is elected. The number of the seats for each losing party is determined proportionally.

Parties and candidates
This is a list of the major parties (and their respective leaders) which participated in the election.

Results
In the first round of elections, on 15–16 May 2011, Pisapia got 48% of the votes and Moratti 41%. As none of them exceeded 50%, a second face-to-face round was scheduled for 29–30 May. This first success of Pisapia was one of a number of successes of the left wing in several other cities and provinces. With the campaign reaching ever harsher tones than before, Pisapia finally won on 30 May, with 55% of the votes. Internet and  social networks played a relevant role in the election of Pisapia.

The candidate of Beppe Grillo's party Five Star Movement, Mattia Calise, who was only 20 years old, obtained nearly 3.5% of the votes.

According to each part's popular vote, the People of Freedom party (PdL) won a narrow victory over the center-left Democratic Party (PD), which however won the majority in the City Council.

Results by zona

After the 2006 election, 8 zone were governed by the centre-right and only one by the centre-left.
Then all were gained by the centre-left coalition.

Table below shows the results for each zona with the percentage for each candidate and president elected:

Source: Municipality of Milan - Electoral Service

Table below shows the seats for each coalition in every zona 's Council:

Source: Municipality of Milan - Electoral Service

Mayoral votes

Second round
Table below shows the results of the votes for mayoral candidates on the second round (29–30 May 2011) in each zona:

Notes

2011 elections in Italy
Milan
Milan
Elections in Milan
2010s in Milan
May 2011 events in Europe